Fuo, is a community in Sagnarigu Municipal Assembly in the Northern Region of Ghana. It is located in the Eastern part of Tamale, Fuo has a community hospital Fuo Community Hospital. It has been one of the fastest and peaceful developing community in the Sagnarigu Municipality.

See also
Suburbs of Tamale (Ghana) metropolis

References 

2. Haruna Mohammed Fuseini,

0200797213

Communities in Ghana
Suburbs of Tamale, Ghana